Kerstin Müller (born 7 June 1969 in Halle, Saxony-Anhalt) is a German rower.

References

External links
 
 

1969 births
Living people
German female rowers
Sportspeople from Halle (Saale)
Rowers at the 1992 Summer Olympics
Olympic gold medalists for Germany
Olympic rowers of Germany
Olympic medalists in rowing
World Rowing Championships medalists for Germany
Medalists at the 1992 Summer Olympics
21st-century German politicians
21st-century German women